Sangita Dhami is a woman's wrestling player. She won a gold medal in 2019 South Asian Games for Nepal.

Sport Life
Dhami is coached by Rajendra Chand, who recruits female wrestlers from schools in Kanchanpur.

Major Medals
She won a gold medal in the 2019 South Asian Games, held in Janakpur. Dhami defeated Bangladeshi wrestler Sakhira Sarakarine for her win. She won Nepal's first ever SAG gold medal in wrestling. Dhami was 19 at the time of her win.

Awards

References

South Asian Games gold medalists for Nepal
South Asian Games medalists in wrestling
Nepalese sportswomen
Year of birth missing (living people)
Living people